The 2016–17 Algerian Basketball Cup is the 48th edition of the Algerian Basketball Cup. It is managed by the FABB and is held in Algiers, in the Hacène Harcha Arena on July 5, 2017.

Bracket

Quarterfinals

Semifinals

Final

References

External links
basketalgerie.com

Algerian Basketball Cup
2017 in Algerian sport